This is a list of the complete operas of the Italian composer Gaetano Latilla (1711–1788).

List

References
Sources
Robinson, Michael F and Monson, Dale E (1992), 'Latilla, Gaetano' in The New Grove Dictionary of Opera, ed. Stanley Sadie (London) 

 
Lists of operas by composer
Lists of compositions by composer